The Niverville Nighthawks are a Canadian junior 'A' ice hockey team based in Niverville, Manitoba.  The Nighthawks are members of the Manitoba Junior Hockey League, with 2022-23 being the team's inaugural season.

Season-by-season record
Note: GP = Games Played, W = Wins, L = Losses, T = Ties, OTL = Overtime Losses, GF = Goals for, GA = Goals against

See also
List of ice hockey teams in Manitoba

References

External links
Official website

2022 establishments in Manitoba
Ice hockey clubs established in 2022
Manitoba Junior Hockey League teams
Niverville, Manitoba